Rasošky is a municipality and village in Náchod District in the Hradec Králové Region of the Czech Republic. It has about 700 inhabitants.

Administrative parts
The village of Dolní Ples t. Vodní Ples is an administrative part of Rasošky.

References

Villages in Náchod District